This article gives detailed results of the 2007 Danish parliamentary election. The Folketing has 179 members. Of these, 135 are elected by proportional representation at district level, while another 40 are allocated based on votes aggregated to the 
regional level. An additional four members are elected to represent Greenland and the Faroe Islands.

Results summary

District Results

Bornholm

|-style="background-color:#E9E9E9"
! style="background-color:#E9E9E9" align="left" valign="top" colspan="2"| Party
! align="center"| Votes
! align="center"| %
! align="center"| +/-
! align="center"| Seats
! align="center"| +/ –
|-
|bgcolor=""| 
|align=left |Social Democrats (Socialdemokraterne) (A)
|align="right" |9,888
|align="right" |35.4%
|align="right" |+2.3%
|align="right" |1
|align="right" |±0
|-
|bgcolor=""|
|align=left| Liberals (Venstre) (V)
|align="right" |7,350
|align="right" |26.3%
|align="right" |-8.5%
|align="right" |1
|align="right" |±0
|-
|bgcolor="#C40006"|
|align=left|Socialist People's Party (Socialistisk Folkeparti) (F)
|align="right" |3,328
|align="right" |11.9%
|align="right" |+7.9%
|align="right" |0
|align="right" |±0
|-
|bgcolor=""| 
|align=left| Conservative People's Party (Det Konservative Folkeparti) (C)
|align=right |1,688
|align=right |6.0%
|align=right |+3.1%
|align=right |0
|align=right |±0
|-
|bgcolor="#E1AD21"|
|align=left|Danish People's Party (Dansk Folkeparti) (O)
|align="right" |640
|align="right" |2.3%
|align="right" |-7.6%
|align="right" |0
|align="right" |±0
|-
|bgcolor=""| 
|align=left| Social Liberal Party (Det Radikale Venstre) (B)
|align="right" |618
|align="right" |2.2%
|align="right" |-1.9%
|align="right" |0
|align="right" |±0
|-
|bgcolor="#9B0059"|
|align=left| New Alliance (Ny Alliance) (Y)
|align="right" |617
|align="right" |2.2%
|align="right" |N/A
|align="right" |0
|align="right" |N/A
|-
|bgcolor="red"|
|align=left| Red-Green Alliance (Enhedslisten) (Ø)
|align=right |541
|align=right |1.9%
|align=right |-2.5%
|align=right |0
|align=right |±0
|-
|bgcolor="gray"|
|align=left|Others
|align="right" |576
|align="right" |2.1%
|align="right" |-0.7%
|align="right" |0
|align="right" |±0
|-
|style="background::#D3D3D3" align=left colspan=2 |Total (Turnout: 85.1%)
|align=right|27,967
|align=right|100%
|align=right|±0%
|align=right|2
|align=right|±0
|-
|}

Members Elected
Jeppe Kofod (Social Democrats)
Peter Juel Jensen (Liberals)

Copenhagen City

|-style="background-color:#E9E9E9"
! style="background-color:#E9E9E9" align="left" valign="top" colspan="2"| Party
! align="center"| Votes
! align="center"| %
! align="center"| +/-
! align="center"| Seats
! align="center"| +/ –
|-
|bgcolor=""| 
|align=left |Social Democrats (Socialdemokraterne) (A)
|align="right" |97,903
|align="right" |24.2%
|align="right" |+0.5%
|align="right" |4
|align="right" |±0
|-
|bgcolor="#C40006"|
|align=left|Socialist People's Party (Socialistisk Folkeparti) (F)
|align="right" |84,843
|align="right" |21.0%
|align="right" |+11.2%
|align="right" |4
|align="right" |+3
|-
|bgcolor=""|
|align=left| Liberals (Venstre) (V)
|align="right" |55,311
|align="right" |13.7%
|align="right" |-3.4%
|align="right" |2
|align="right" |-1
|-
|bgcolor="#E1AD21"|
|align=left|Danish People's Party (Dansk Folkeparti) (O)
|align="right" |42,906
|align="right" |10.6%
|align="right" |-0.6%
|align="right" |2
|align="right" |±0
|-
|bgcolor=""| 
|align=left| Conservative People's Party (Det Konservative Folkeparti) (C)
|align=right |40,811
|align=right |10.1%
|align=right |+0.5%
|align=right |1
|align=right |±0
|-
|bgcolor=""| 
|align=left| Social Liberal Party (Det Radikale Venstre) (B)
|align="right" |35,858
|align="right" |8.9%
|align="right" |-8.0%
|align="right" |1
|align="right" |-2
|-
|bgcolor="red"|
|align=left| Red-Green Alliance (Enhedslisten) (Ø)
|align=right |26,963
|align=right |6.7%
|align=right |-2.1%
|align=right |1
|align=right |±0
|-
|bgcolor="#9B0059"|
|align=left| New Alliance (Ny Alliance) (Y)
|align="right" |17,223
|align="right" |4.3%
|align="right" |N/A
|align="right" |0
|align="right" |N/A
|-
|bgcolor="gray"|
|align=left|Others
|align="right" |2,169
|align="right" |0.5%
|align="right" |-1.2%
|align="right" |0
|align="right" |±0
|-
|style="background::#D3D3D3" align=left colspan=2 |Total (Turnout: 84.8%)
|align=right|403,987
|align=right|100%
|align=right|±0%
|align=right|15
|align=right|±0
|-
|}

Members Elected
Yildiz Akdogan (Social Democrats)
Christine Antorini (Social Democrats)
Karen Hækkerup (Social Democrats)
Helle Thorning-Schmidt (Social Democrats)
Ida Auken (Socialist People's Party)
Özlem Sara Cekic (Socialist People's Party)
Anne Grete Holmsgaard (Socialist People's Party)
Kamal Qureshi (Socialist People's Party)
Rikke Hvilshøj (Liberals)
Søren Pind (Liberals)
Martin Henriksen (Danish People's Party)
Peter Skaarup (Danish People's Party)
Per Stig Møller (Conservative People's Party)
Lone Dybkjær (Social Liberal Party)
Johanne Schmidt-Nielsen (Red-Green Alliance)

Copenhagen County

|-style="background-color:#E9E9E9"
! style="background-color:#E9E9E9" align="left" valign="top" colspan="2"| Party
! align="center"| Votes
! align="center"| %
! align="center"| +/-
! align="center"| Seats
! align="center"| +/ –
|-
|bgcolor=""| 
|align=left |Social Democrats (Socialdemokraterne) (A)
|align="right" |85,821
|align="right" |27.6%
|align="right" |+1.0%
|align="right" |4
|align="right" |±0
|-
|bgcolor=""|
|align=left| Liberals (Venstre) (V)
|align="right" |60,395
|align="right" |19.5%
|align="right" |-3.7%
|align="right" |2
|align="right" |-1
|-
|bgcolor="#E1AD21"|
|align=left|Danish People's Party (Dansk Folkeparti) (O)
|align="right" |45,440
|align="right" |14.6%
|align="right" |-0.6%
|align="right" |2
|align="right" |±0
|-
|bgcolor="#C40006"|
|align=left|Socialist People's Party (Socialistisk Folkeparti) (F)
|align="right" |41,235
|align="right" |13.3%
|align="right" |+6.9%
|align="right" |2
|align="right" |+2
|-
|bgcolor=""| 
|align=left| Conservative People's Party (Det Konservative Folkeparti) (C)
|align=right |40,897
|align=right |13.2%
|align=right |+0.5%
|align=right |1
|align=right |±0
|-
|bgcolor=""| 
|align=left| Social Liberal Party (Det Radikale Venstre) (B)
|align="right" |17,075
|align="right" |5.5%
|align="right" |-4.0%
|align="right" |0
|align="right" |-1
|-
|bgcolor="#9B0059"|
|align=left| New Alliance (Ny Alliance) (Y)
|align="right" |10,294
|align="right" |3.3%
|align="right" |N/A
|align="right" |0
|align="right" |N/A
|-
|bgcolor="red"|
|align=left| Red-Green Alliance (Enhedslisten) (Ø)
|align=right |7,832
|align=right |2.5%
|align=right |-1.4%
|align=right |0
|align=right |±0
|-
|bgcolor="gray"|
|align=left|Others
|align="right" |1,526
|align="right" |4.9%
|align="right" |+3.2%
|align="right" |0
|align="right" |±0
|-
|style="background::#D3D3D3" align=left colspan=2 |Total (Turnout: 88.4%)
|align=right|310,515
|align=right|100%
|align=right|±0%
|align=right|11
|align=right|±0
|-
|}

Members Elected
Morten Bødskov (Social Democrats)
Mette Frederiksen (Social Democrats)
Sophie Hæstorp-Andersen (Social Democrats)
Mogens Lykketoft (Social Democrats)
Karen Ellemann (Liberals)
Bertel Haarder (Liberals)
Mikkel Dencker (Danish People's Party)
Søren Espersen (Danish People's Party)
Hanne Agersnap (Socialist People's Party)
Holger Nielsen (Socialist People's Party)
Connie Hedegaard (Conservative People's Party)

East Jutland

|-style="background-color:#E9E9E9"
! style="background-color:#E9E9E9" align="left" valign="top" colspan="2"| Party
! align="center"| Votes
! align="center"| %
! align="center"| +/-
! align="center"| Seats
! align="center"| +/ –
|-
|bgcolor=""| 
|align=left |Social Democrats (Socialdemokraterne) (A)
|align="right" |127,432
|align="right" |27.6%
|align="right" |-1.0%
|align="right" |6
|align="right" |±0
|-
|bgcolor=""|
|align=left| Liberals (Venstre) (V)
|align="right" |125,074
|align="right" |27.0%
|align="right" |-1.5%
|align="right" |5
|align="right" |-1
|-
|bgcolor="#C40006"|
|align=left|Socialist People's Party (Socialistisk Folkeparti) (F)
|align="right" |61,496
|align="right" |13.3%
|align="right" |+7.4%
|align="right" |2
|align="right" |+1
|-
|bgcolor="#E1AD21"|
|align=left|Danish People's Party (Dansk Folkeparti) (O)
|align="right" |56,218
|align="right" |12.2%
|align="right" |+0.7%
|align="right" |2
|align="right" |±0
|-
|bgcolor=""| 
|align=left| Conservative People's Party (Det Konservative Folkeparti) (C)
|align=right |40,068
|align=right |8.7%
|align=right |-0.6%
|align=right |1
|align=right |±0
|-
|bgcolor=""| 
|align=left| Social Liberal Party (Det Radikale Venstre) (B)
|align="right" |24,921
|align="right" |5.4%
|align="right" |-3.9%
|align="right" |1
|align="right" |±0
|-
|bgcolor="#9B0059"|
|align=left| New Alliance (Ny Alliance) (Y)
|align="right" |13,389
|align="right" |2.9%
|align="right" |N/A
|align="right" |0
|align="right" |N/A
|-
|bgcolor="red"|
|align=left| Red-Green Alliance (Enhedslisten) (Ø)
|align=right |9,887
|align=right |2.1%
|align=right |-1.4%
|align=right |0
|align=right |±0
|-
|bgcolor="gray"|
|align=left|Others
|align="right" |3,914
|align="right" |0.8%
|align="right" |-0.5%
|align="right" |0
|align="right" |±0
|-
|style="background::#D3D3D3" align=left colspan=2 |Total (Turnout: 87.3%)
|align=right|462,399
|align=right|100%
|align=right|±0%
|align=right|17
|align=right|±0
|-
|}

Members Elected
Svend Auken (Social Democrats)
René Skau Björnsson (Social Democrats)
Kirsten Brosbøl (Social Democrats)
Torben Hansen (Social Democrats)
Leif Lahn Jensen (Social Democrats)
Henrik Dam Kristensen (Social Democrats)
Kim Andersen (Liberals)
Anne-Mette Winther Christiansen (Liberals)
Karen Jespersen (Liberals)
Troels Lund Poulsen (Liberals)
Eyvind Vesselbo (Liberals)
Eigil Andersen (Socialist People's Party)
Pernille Frahm (Socialist People's Party)
Morten Messerschmidt (Danish People's Party)
Hans Kristian Skibby (Danish People's Party)
Henriette Kjær (Conservative People's Party)
Morten Østergaard (Social Liberal Party)

Fyn

|-style="background-color:#E9E9E9"
! style="background-color:#E9E9E9" align="left" valign="top" colspan="2"| Party
! align="center"| Votes
! align="center"| %
! align="center"| +/-
! align="center"| Seats
! align="center"| +/ –
|-
|bgcolor=""| 
|align=left |Social Democrats (Socialdemokraterne) (A)
|align="right" |83,395
|align="right" |26.9%
|align="right" |-2.0%
|align="right" |4
|align="right" |±0
|-
|bgcolor=""|
|align=left| Liberals (Venstre) (V)
|align="right" |66,198
|align="right" |21.4%
|align="right" |-1.8%
|align="right" |3
|align="right" |±0
|-
|bgcolor="#E1AD21"|
|align=left|Danish People's Party (Dansk Folkeparti) (O)
|align="right" |45,843
|align="right" |14.8%
|align="right" |+1.5%
|align="right" |2
|align="right" |±0
|-
|bgcolor="#C40006"|
|align=left|Socialist People's Party (Socialistisk Folkeparti) (F)
|align="right" |43,258
|align="right" |14.0%
|align="right" |+7.9%
|align="right" |2
|align="right" |+2
|-
|bgcolor=""| 
|align=left| Conservative People's Party (Det Konservative Folkeparti) (C)
|align=right |41,225
|align=right |13.3%
|align=right |-1.7%
|align=right |1
|align=right |-1
|-
|bgcolor=""| 
|align=left| Social Liberal Party (Det Radikale Venstre) (B)
|align="right" |15,554
|align="right" |5.0%
|align="right" |-3.4%
|align="right" |0
|align="right" |-1
|-
|bgcolor="#9B0059"|
|align=left| New Alliance (Ny Alliance) (Y)
|align="right" |7,476
|align="right" |2.4%
|align="right" |N/A
|align="right" |0
|align="right" |N/A
|-
|bgcolor="red"|
|align=left| Red-Green Alliance (Enhedslisten) (Ø)
|align=right |5,446
|align=right |1.8%
|align=right |-1.2%
|align=right |0
|align=right |±0
|-
|bgcolor="gray"|
|align=left|Others
|align="right" |1,263
|align="right" |0.4%
|align="right" |-0.8%
|align="right" |0
|align="right" |±0
|-
|style="background::#D3D3D3" align=left colspan=2 |Total (Turnout: 86.6%)
|align=right|309,658
|align=right|100%
|align=right|±0%
|align=right|12
|align=right|±0
|-
|}

Members Elected
Poul Andersen (Social Democrats)
Carsten Hansen (Social Democrats)
Niels Sindal (Social Democrats)
Julie Skovsby (Social Democrats)
Erling Bonnesen (Liberals)
Britta Schall Holberg (Liberals)
Lars Christian Lilleholt (Liberals)
Kristian Thulesen Dahl (Danish People's Party)
Tina Petersen (Danish People's Party)
Anne Baastrup (Socialist People's Party)
Karsten Hønge (Socialist People's Party)
Bendt Bendtsen (Conservative People's Party)

North Jutland

|-style="background-color:#E9E9E9"
! style="background-color:#E9E9E9" align="left" valign="top" colspan="2"| Party
! align="center"| Votes
! align="center"| %
! align="center"| +/-
! align="center"| Seats
! align="center"| +/ –
|-
|bgcolor=""| 
|align=left |Social Democrats (Socialdemokraterne) (A)
|align="right" |108,236
|align="right" |29.3%
|align="right" |-1.0%
|align="right" |5
|align="right" |±0
|-
|bgcolor=""|
|align=left| Liberals (Venstre) (V)
|align="right" |94,030
|align="right" |25.5%
|align="right" |-3.8%
|align="right" |4
|align="right" |-1
|-
|bgcolor="#E1AD21"|
|align=left|Danish People's Party (Dansk Folkeparti) (O)
|align="right" |50,253
|align="right" |13.6%
|align="right" |+1.4%
|align="right" |2
|align="right" |±0
|-
|bgcolor=""| 
|align=left| Conservative People's Party (Det Konservative Folkeparti) (C)
|align=right |49,483
|align=right |13.4%
|align=right |+2.3%
|align=right |2
|align=right |±0
|-
|bgcolor="#C40006"|
|align=left|Socialist People's Party (Socialistisk Folkeparti) (F)
|align="right" |37,977
|align="right" |10.3%
|align="right" |+6.0%
|align="right" |2
|align="right" |+2
|-
|bgcolor=""| 
|align=left| Social Liberal Party (Det Radikale Venstre) (B)
|align="right" |14,406
|align="right" |3.9%
|align="right" |-3.5%
|align="right" |0
|align="right" |-1
|-
|bgcolor="#9B0059"|
|align=left| New Alliance (Ny Alliance) (Y)
|align="right" |6,582
|align="right" |1.8%
|align="right" |N/A
|align="right" |0
|align="right" |N/A
|-
|bgcolor="red"|
|align=left| Red-Green Alliance (Enhedslisten) (Ø)
|align=right |4,082
|align=right |1.1%
|align=right |-1.0%
|align=right |0
|align=right |±0
|-
|bgcolor="gray"|
|align=left|Others
|align="right" |3,944
|align="right" |1.1%
|align="right" |-0.1%
|align="right" |0
|align="right" |±0
|-
|style="background::#D3D3D3" align=left colspan=2 |Total (Turnout: 85.3%)
|align=right|368,993
|align=right|100%
|align=right|±0%
|align=right|15
|align=right|±0
|-
|}

Members Elected
Ole Vagn Christensen (Social Democrats)
Lene Hansen (Social Democrats)
Orla Hav (Social Democrats)
Bjarne Laustsen (Social Democrats)
Rasmus Prehn (Social Democrats)
Birgitte Josefsen (Liberals)
Karsten Lauritzen (Liberals)
Tina Nedergaard (Liberals)
Torsten Schack Pedersen (Liberals)
Bent Bøgsted (Danish People's Party)
Anita Knakkergaard (Danish People's Party)
Lene Espersen (Conservative People's Party)
Jakob Axel Nielsen (Conservative People's Party)
Pernille Vigsø Bagge (Socialist People's Party)
Karl Bornhøft (Socialist People's Party)

North Zealand

|-style="background-color:#E9E9E9"
! style="background-color:#E9E9E9" align="left" valign="top" colspan="2"| Party
! align="center"| Votes
! align="center"| %
! align="center"| +/-
! align="center"| Seats
! align="center"| +/ –
|-
|bgcolor=""|
|align=left| Liberals (Venstre) (V)
|align="right" |78,834
|align="right" |28.2%
|align="right" |-3.8%
|align="right" |4
|align="right" |±0
|-
|bgcolor=""| 
|align=left |Social Democrats (Socialdemokraterne) (A)
|align="right" |57,861
|align="right" |20.7%
|align="right" |+1.4%
|align="right" |2
|align="right" |±0
|-
|bgcolor=""| 
|align=left| Conservative People's Party (Det Konservative Folkeparti) (C)
|align=right |38,667
|align=right |13.4%
|align=right |+0.4%
|align=right |1
|align=right |-1
|-
|bgcolor="#E1AD21"|
|align=left|Danish People's Party (Dansk Folkeparti) (O)
|align="right" |35,252
|align="right" |12.6%
|align="right" |-0.2%
|align="right" |1
|align="right" |±0
|-
|bgcolor="#C40006"|
|align=left|Socialist People's Party (Socialistisk Folkeparti) (F)
|align="right" |30,142
|align="right" |10.8%
|align="right" |+5.5%
|align="right" |1
|align="right" |+1
|-
|bgcolor=""| 
|align=left| Social Liberal Party (Det Radikale Venstre) (B)
|align="right" |20,031
|align="right" |7.1%
|align="right" |-4.5%
|align="right" |1
|align="right" |±0
|-
|bgcolor="#9B0059"|
|align=left| New Alliance (Ny Alliance) (Y)
|align="right" |12,107
|align="right" |4.3%
|align="right" |N/A
|align="right" |0
|align="right" |N/A
|-
|bgcolor="red"|
|align=left| Red-Green Alliance (Enhedslisten) (Ø)
|align=right |5,612
|align=right |2.0%
|align=right |-1.0%
|align=right |0
|align=right |±0
|-
|bgcolor="gray"|
|align=left|Others
|align="right" |1,457
|align="right" |0.5%
|align="right" |-0.8%
|align="right" |0
|align="right" |±0
|-
|style="background::#D3D3D3" align=left colspan=2 |Total (Turnout: 89.0%)
|align=right|279,963
|align=right|100%
|align=right|±0%
|align=right|10
|align=right|±0
|-
|}

Members Elected
Claus Hjort Frederiksen (Liberals)
Sophie Løhde (Liberals)
Lars Løkke Rasmussen (Liberals)
Thor Pedersen (Liberals)
Nick Hækkerup (Social Democrats)
Lone Møller (Social Democrats)
Pia Christmas-Møller (Conservative People's Party)
Pia Adelsteen (Danish People's Party)
Pia Olsen Dyhr (Socialist People's Party)
Margrethe Vestager (Social Liberal Party)

South Jutland

|-style="background-color:#E9E9E9"
! style="background-color:#E9E9E9" align="left" valign="top" colspan="2"| Party
! align="center"| Votes
! align="center"| %
! align="center"| +/-
! align="center"| Seats
! align="center"| +/ –
|-
|bgcolor=""|
|align=left| Liberals (Venstre) (V)
|align="right" |153,688
|align="right" |34.6%
|align="right" |-2.1%
|align="right" |7
|align="right" |±0
|-
|bgcolor=""| 
|align=left |Social Democrats (Socialdemokraterne) (A)
|align="right" |101,557
|align="right" |22.9%
|align="right" |-1.2%
|align="right" |5
|align="right" |±0
|-
|bgcolor="#E1AD21"|
|align=left|Danish People's Party (Dansk Folkeparti) (O)
|align="right" |69,762
|align="right" |15.7%
|align="right" |+0.8%
|align="right" |3
|align="right" |±0
|-
|bgcolor="#C40006"|
|align=left|Socialist People's Party (Socialistisk Folkeparti) (F)
|align="right" |50,484
|align="right" |11.4%
|align="right" |+6.3%
|align="right" |2
|align="right" |+1
|-
|bgcolor=""| 
|align=left| Conservative People's Party (Det Konservative Folkeparti) (C)
|align=right |37,055
|align=right |8.3%
|align=right |+0.3%
|align=right |1
|align=right |±0
|-
|bgcolor=""| 
|align=left| Social Liberal Party (Det Radikale Venstre) (B)
|align="right" |15,201
|align="right" |3.4%
|align="right" |-2.7%
|align="right" |0
|align="right" |-1
|-
|bgcolor="#9B0059"|
|align=left| New Alliance (Ny Alliance) (Y)
|align="right" |8,481
|align="right" |1.9%
|align="right" |N/A
|align="right" |0
|align="right" |N/A
|-
|bgcolor="red"|
|align=left| Red-Green Alliance (Enhedslisten) (Ø)
|align=right |3,626
|align=right |0.8%
|align=right |-0.9%
|align=right |0
|align=right |±0
|-
|bgcolor="gray"|
|align=left|Others
|align="right" |4,325
|align="right" |1.0%
|align="right" |-0.1%
|align="right" |0
|align="right" |±0
|-
|style="background::#D3D3D3" align=left colspan=2 |Total (Turnout: 85.9%)
|align=right|444,179
|align=right|100%
|align=right|±0%
|align=right|18
|align=right|±0
|-
|}

Members Elected
Eva Kjer Hansen (Liberals)
Ellen Trane Nørby (Liberals)
Preben Rudiengaard (Liberals)
Hans Christian Schmidt (Liberals)
Hans Christian Thoning (Liberals)
Ulla Tørnæs (Liberals)
Jens Vibjerg (Liberals)
Benny Engelbrecht (Social Democrats)
Karen Johanne Klint (Social Democrats)
Kim Mortensen (Social Democrats)
Julie Rademacher (Social Democrats)
Lise von Seelen (Social Democrats)
Mogens Camre (Danish People's Party)
Jørn Dohrmann (Danish People's Party)
Søren Krarup (Danish People's Party)
Jesper Petersen (Socialist People's Party)
Villy Søvndal (Socialist People's Party)
Carina Christensen (Conservative People's Party)

West Jutland

|-style="background-color:#E9E9E9"
! style="background-color:#E9E9E9" align="left" valign="top" colspan="2"| Party
! align="center"| Votes
! align="center"| %
! align="center"| +/-
! align="center"| Seats
! align="center"| +/ –
|-
|bgcolor=""|
|align=left| Liberals (Venstre) (V)
|align="right" |121,292
|align="right" |37.3%
|align="right" |-1.9%
|align="right" |6
|align="right" |±0
|-
|bgcolor=""| 
|align=left |Social Democrats (Socialdemokraterne) (A)
|align="right" |74,664
|align="right" |23.0%
|align="right" |+0.4%
|align="right" |4
|align="right" |±0
|-
|bgcolor="#E1AD21"|
|align=left|Danish People's Party (Dansk Folkeparti) (O)
|align="right" |42,357
|align="right" |13.0%
|align="right" |+0.5%
|align="right" |2
|align="right" |±0
|-
|bgcolor="#C40006"|
|align=left|Socialist People's Party (Socialistisk Folkeparti) (F)
|align="right" |30,642
|align="right" |9.4%
|align="right" |+4.6%
|align="right" |1
|align="right" |+1
|-
|bgcolor=""| 
|align=left| Conservative People's Party (Det Konservative Folkeparti) (C)
|align=right |24,917
|align=right |7.7%
|align=right |+0.1%
|align=right |1
|align=right |±0
|-
|bgcolor=""| 
|align=left| Social Liberal Party (Det Radikale Venstre) (B)
|align="right" |12,776
|align="right" |3.9%
|align="right" |-2.6%
|align="right" |0
|align="right" |-1
|-
|bgcolor="#9B0059"|
|align=left| New Alliance (Ny Alliance) (Y)
|align="right" |6,725
|align="right" |2.1%
|align="right" |N/A
|align="right" |0
|align="right" |N/A
|-
|bgcolor="red"|
|align=left| Red-Green Alliance (Enhedslisten) (Ø)
|align="right" |2,677
|align="right" |0.8%
|align="right" |-0.8%
|align="right" |0
|align="right" |±0
|-
|bgcolor="gray"|
|align=left|Others
|align="right" |9,273
|align="right" |2.9%
|align="right" |-0.6%
|align="right" |0
|align="right" |±0
|-
|style="background::#D3D3D3" align=left colspan=2 |Total (Turnout: 87.3%)
|align=right|325,323
|align=right|100%
|align=right|±0%
|align=right|14
|align=right|±0
|-
|}

Members Elected
Søren Gade (Liberals)
Kristian Jensen (Liberals)
Jens Kirk (Liberals)
Kristian Pihl Lorentzen (Liberals)
Helge Sander (Liberals)
Inger Støjberg (Liberals)
Mogens Jensen (Social Democrats)
Thomas Jensen (Social Democrats)
Jens Christian Lund (Social Democrats)
Jens Peter Vernersen (Social Democrats)
Christian Hansen (Danish People's Party)
Jesper Langballe (Danish People's Party)
Steen Gade (Socialist People's Party)
Per Ørum Jørgensen (Conservative People's Party)

Zealand

|-style="background-color:#E9E9E9"
! style="background-color:#E9E9E9" align="left" valign="top" colspan="2"| Party
! align="center"| Votes
! align="center"| %
! align="center"| +/-
! align="center"| Seats
! align="center"| +/ –
|-
|bgcolor=""|
|align=left| Liberals (Venstre) (V)
|align="right" |146,300
|align="right" |27.8%
|align="right" |-2.6%
|align="right" |6
|align="right" |-1
|-
|bgcolor=""| 
|align=left |Social Democrats (Socialdemokraterne) (A)
|align="right" |134,280
|align="right" |25.5%
|align="right" |-0.7%
|align="right" |6
|align="right" |±0
|-
|bgcolor="#E1AD21"|
|align=left|Danish People's Party (Dansk Folkeparti) (O)
|align="right" |88,140
|align="right" |16.8%
|align="right" |+1.3%
|align="right" |4
|align="right" |±0
|-
|bgcolor=""| 
|align=left| Conservative People's Party (Det Konservative Folkeparti) (C)
|align=right |38,667
|align=right |13.48%
|align=right |+0.4%
|align=right |1
|align=right |-1
|-
|bgcolor="#C40006"|
|align=left|Socialist People's Party (Socialistisk Folkeparti) (F)
|align="right" |30,142
|align="right" |10.8%
|align="right" |+5.5%
|align="right" |1
|align="right" |+1
|-
|bgcolor=""| 
|align=left| Social Liberal Party (Det Radikale Venstre) (B)
|align="right" |20,031
|align="right" |7.1%
|align="right" |-4.5%
|align="right" |1
|align="right" |±0
|-
|bgcolor="#9B0059"|
|align=left| New Alliance (Ny Alliance) (Y)
|align="right" |12,107
|align="right" |4.3%
|align="right" |N/A
|align="right" |0
|align="right" |N/A
|-
|bgcolor="red"|
|align=left| Red-Green Alliance (Enhedslisten) (Ø)
|align=right |5,612
|align=right |2.0%
|align=right |-1.0%
|align=right |0
|align=right |±0
|-
|bgcolor="gray"|
|align=left|Others
|align="right" |1,457
|align="right" |0.5%
|align="right" |-0.8%
|align="right" |0
|align="right" |±0
|-
|style="background::#D3D3D3" align=left colspan=2 |Total (Turnout: 89.0%)
|align=right|279,963
|align=right|100%
|align=right|±0%
|align=right|10
|align=right|±0
|-
|}

Members Elected
Claus Hjort Frederiksen (Liberals)
Sophie Løhde (Liberals)
Lars Løkke Rasmussen (Liberals)
Thor Pedersen (Liberals)
Nick Hækkerup (Social Democrats)
Lone Møller (Social Democrats)
Pia Christmas-Møller (Conservative People's Party)
Pia Adelsteen (Danish People's Party)
Pia Olsen Dyhr (Socialist People's Party)
Margrethe Vestager (Social Liberal Party)

Regional Results

Capital City Region

|-style="background-color:#E9E9E9"
! style="background-color:#E9E9E9" align="left" valign="top" colspan="2"| Party
! align="center"| Votes
! align="center"| %
! align="center"| +/-
! align="center"| Seats
|-
|bgcolor=""| 
|align=left |Social Democrats (Socialdemokraterne) (A)
|align="right" |251,473
|align="right" |24.6%
|align="right" |+1.0%
|align="right" |1
|-
|bgcolor=""|
|align=left| Liberals (Venstre) (V)
|align="right" |201,890
|align="right" |19.8%
|align="right" |-3.7%
|align="right" |1
|-
|bgcolor="#C40006"|
|align=left|Socialist People's Party (Socialistisk Folkeparti) (F)
|align="right" |159,548
|align="right" |15.6%
|align="right" |+8.2%
|align="right" |1
|-
|bgcolor="#E1AD21"|
|align=left|Danish People's Party (Dansk Folkeparti) (O)
|align="right" |126,959
|align="right" |12.4%
|align="right" |-0.4%
|align="right" |1
|-
|bgcolor=""| 
|align=left| Conservative People's Party (Det Konservative Folkeparti) (C)
|align=right |122,063
|align=right |11.9%
|align=right |+0.5%
|align=right |3
|-
|bgcolor=""| 
|align=left| Social Liberal Party (Det Radikale Venstre) (B)
|align="right" |73,582
|align="right" |7.2%
|align="right" |-5.7%
|align="right" |1
|-
|bgcolor="red"|
|align=left| Red-Green Alliance (Enhedslisten) (Ø)
|align=right |40,948
|align=right |4.0%
|align=right |-1.6%
|align=right |1
|-
|bgcolor="#9B0059"|
|align=left| New Alliance (Ny Alliance) (Y)
|align="right" |40,241
|align="right" |3.9%
|align="right" |N/A
|align="right" |2
|-
|bgcolor="gray"|
|align=left|Others
|align="right" | 5,728
|align="right" |0.5%
|align="right" |-0.2%
|align="right" |0
|-
|style="background::#D3D3D3" align=left colspan=2 |Total (Turnout: 86.7%)
|align=right|1,022,432
|align=right|100%
|align=right|±0%
|align=right|11
|-
|}

Members Elected
Klaus Hækkerup (Social Democrats)
Gitte Lillelund Bech (Liberals)
Nanna Westerby Jensen (Socialist People's Party)
Marlene Harpsøe (Danish People's Party)
Lars Barfoed (Conservative People's Party)
Charlotte Dyremose (Conservative People's Party)
Helle Sjelle (Conservative People's Party)
Morten Helveg Petersen (Social Liberal Party)
Frank Aaen (Red-Green Alliance)
Malou Aamund (New Alliance)
Naser Khader (New Alliance)

Zealand-South Denmark Region

|-style="background-color:#E9E9E9"
! style="background-color:#E9E9E9" align="left" valign="top" colspan="2"| Party
! align="center"| Votes
! align="center"| %
! align="center"| +/-
! align="center"| Seats
|-
|bgcolor=""|
|align=left| Liberals (Venstre) (V)
|align="right" |366,186
|align="right" |28.6%
|align="right" |-2.2%
|align="right" |3
|-
|bgcolor=""| 
|align=left |Social Democrats (Socialdemokraterne) (A)
|align="right" |319,232
|align="right" |24.9%
|align="right" |-1.2%
|align="right" |1
|-
|bgcolor="#E1AD21"|
|align=left|Danish People's Party (Dansk Folkeparti) (O)
|align="right" |203,745
|align="right" |15.9%
|align="right" |+1.2%
|align="right" |2
|-
|bgcolor="#C40006"|
|align=left|Socialist People's Party (Socialistisk Folkeparti) (F)
|align="right" |161,312
|align="right" |12.6%
|align="right" |+6.9%
|align="right" |1
|-
|bgcolor=""| 
|align=left| Conservative People's Party (Det Konservative Folkeparti) (C)
|align=right |122,873
|align=right |9.6%
|align=right |-0.6%
|align=right |2
|-
|bgcolor=""| 
|align=left| Social Liberal Party (Det Radikale Venstre) (B)
|align="right" |51,476
|align="right" |4.0%
|align="right" |-3.3%
|align="right" |3
|-
|bgcolor="#9B0059"|
|align=left| New Alliance (Ny Alliance) (Y)
|align="right" |30,358
|align="right" |2.4%
|align="right" |N/A
|align="right" |2
|-
|bgcolor="red"|
|align=left| Red-Green Alliance (Enhedslisten) (Ø)
|align=right |17,388
|align=right |1.4%
|align=right |-1.1%
|align=right |1
|-
|bgcolor="gray"|
|align=left|Others
|align="right" |7,703
|align="right" |0.6%
|align="right" |-0.8%
|align="right" |0
|-
|style="background::#D3D3D3" align=left colspan=2 |Total (Turnout: 86.4%)
|align=right|1,280,273
|align=right|100%
|align=right|±0%
|align=right|15
|-
|}

Members Elected
Peter Christensen (Liberals)
Louise Scack Elholm (Liberals)
Flemming Damgaard Larsen (Liberals)
Lennart Damsbo-Andersen (Social Democrats)
Liselott Blixt (Danish People's Party)
Karin Nødgaard (Danish People's Party)
Karina Lorentzen (Socialist People's Party)
Vivi Kier (Conservative People's Party)
Mike Legarth (Conservative People's Party)
Simon Emil Ammitzbøll (Social Liberal Party)
Bente Dahl (Social Liberal Party)
Niels Helveg Petersen (Social Liberal Party)
Jørgen Poulsen (New Alliance)
Gitte Seeberg (New Alliance)
Line Barfod (Red-Green Alliance)

Mid and North Jutland Region

|-style="background-color:#E9E9E9"
! style="background-color:#E9E9E9" align="left" valign="top" colspan="2"| Party
! align="center"| Votes
! align="center"| %
! align="center"| +/-
! align="center"| Seats
|-
|bgcolor=""|
|align=left| Liberals (Venstre) (V)
|align="right" |340,396
|align="right" |29.4%
|align="right" |-2.5%
|align="right" |2
|-
|bgcolor=""| 
|align=left |Social Democrats (Socialdemokraterne) (A)
|align="right" |310,332
|align="right" |26.8%
|align="right" |-0.7%
|align="right" |2
|-
|bgcolor="#E1AD21"|
|align=left|Danish People's Party (Dansk Folkeparti) (O)
|align="right" |148,828
|align="right" |12.9%
|align="right" |+0.9%
|align="right" |2
|-
|bgcolor="#C40006"|
|align=left|Socialist People's Party (Socialistisk Folkeparti) (F)
|align="right" |130,115
|align="right" |11.3%
|align="right" |+6.2%
|align="right" |2
|-
|bgcolor=""| 
|align=left| Conservative People's Party (Det Konservative Folkeparti) (C)
|align=right |114,468
|align=right |9.9%
|align=right |+0.5%
|align=right |2
|-
|bgcolor=""| 
|align=left| Social Liberal Party (Det Radikale Venstre) (B)
|align="right" |52,103
|align="right" |4.5%
|align="right" |-3.5%
|align="right" |2
|-
|bgcolor="#9B0059"|
|align=left| New Alliance (Ny Alliance) (Y)
|align="right" |26,696
|align="right" |2.3%
|align="right" |N/A
|align="right" |1
|-
|bgcolor="red"|
|align=left| Red-Green Alliance (Enhedslisten) (Ø)
|align=right |16,646
|align=right |1.4%
|align=right |-1.1%
|align=right |1
|-
|bgcolor="gray"|
|align=left|Others
|align="right" |17,131
|align="right" |1.5%
|align="right" |+0.3%
|align="right" |0
|-
|style="background::#D3D3D3" align=left colspan=2 |Total (Turnout: 86.7%)
|align=right|1,156,715
|align=right|100%
|align=right|±0%
|align=right|14
|-
|}

Members Elected
Anders Broholm (Liberals)
Eyvind Vesselbo (Liberals)
Anne-Marie Meldgaard (Social Democrats)
Flemming Møller Mortensen (Social Democrats)
Kim Christiansen (Danish People's Party)
Ib Poulsen (Danish People's Party)
Jonas Dahl (Socialist People's Party)
Kristen Touborg (Socialist People's Party)
Tom Behnke (Conservative People's Party)
Knud Kristensen (Conservative People's Party)
Marianne Jelved (Social Liberal Party)
Johs Poulsen (Social Liberal Party)
Anders Samuelsen (New Alliance)
Per Clausen (Red-Green Alliance)

Sources
psephos.adamcarr.net Psephos - Adam Carr's Election Archive
dst.dk Danmarks Statistik (in Danish)

2007
Parliamentary results
2007 elections in Europe